Bondini is a small Aboriginal community, located 10 km east of Wiluna in the Mid West region of Western Australia, within the Shire of Wiluna.

Native title 
The community is located within the determination area of the Wiluna (WAD6164/1998, WAD248/2007, WAS181/2012) native title claim area.

Governance 
Bondini is not represented by an Incorporated Community Council. As a replacement the community is semi represented by the Mid-west Employment Education Development Aboriginal Corporation.

Town planning 
Bondini Layout Plan No.1 has been prepared in accordance with State Planning Policy 3.2 Aboriginal Settlements. Layout Plan No.1 was endorsed by the community on 8 August 2012, and by the Western Australian Planning Commission on 24 February 2004.

The Layout Plan map-set and background report can be viewed at Planning Western Australia's website.

External links
 Planning Western Australia's official site – Bondini Layout Plan (https://www.dplh.wa.gov.au/information-and-services/state-planning/aboriginal-communities/aboriginal-community-maps/layout-plans)

References

Towns in Western Australia
Aboriginal communities in Mid West (Western Australia)